Yeary is a surname. Notable people with the surname include:

Jimmy Yeary, American singer and songwriter
 (born 1966), American judge
Mark Yeary, American engineer

English-language surnames